Qujiang Town is an urban town in Anhua County, Hunan Province, People's Republic of China.

Administrative division
The town is divided into 11 villages and 1 community, the following areas: Qujiang Community, Fuxi Village, Datang Village, Yanjia Village, Chengping Village, Dacang Village, Taoping Village, Yuanda Village, Lianli Village, Da'an Village, Shengjia Village, and Lianhua Village (渠江社区、敷溪村、大塘村、晏家村、城坪村、大仓村、桃坪村、沅大村、连里村、大安村、升家村、连华村).

References

External links

Divisions of Anhua County